Fabian Friedrich (born 1980) is a German swimmer who won one silver and two gold medals at European Short Course Swimming Championships in 2003 and 2004. While winning the 4×50 m medley relay in 2003, his team set a new world record.

References

1980 births
Living people
German male swimmers
20th-century German people
21st-century German people